Gedeon Burkhard (born 3 July 1969) is a German film and television actor. Although he has appeared in numerous films and TV series in both Europe and the US, he is probably best recognised for his role as Alexander Brandtner in the Austrian/German television series Kommissar Rex (1997–2001), which has been aired on television in numerous countries around the world, or as Corporal Wilhelm Wicki in the 2009 film Inglourious Basterds. He is also well recognised for his role as Chris Ritter in the long-running series Alarm für Cobra 11.

Life and career
Gedeon Burkhard was born in Munich, West Germany, the son of Wolfgang Burkhard and German actress Elisabeth von Molo (then Burkhard) who is the granddaughter of Alessandro Moissi, a famous Albanian actor of the 20th century. Gedeon was educated at a boarding school in England and began his acting career in 1979 in the German TV film Tante Maria.

During the 1990s, he lived in the United States, working in several productions, but without much recognition. Burkhard married Birgit Cunningham, then divorced three months later. After that, he lived in Vienna for Kommisar Rex for more than five years, then moved to Berlin. Burkhard was working in Cologne on the TV series Alarm für Cobra 11 as the detective Chris Ritter until November 2007. His character Chris Ritter had a heroic death. He then returned to Berlin to be close to his daughter and to work on projects. He said "For the moment I will dedicate myself again fully to my artistic vagabond life in Berlin". Burkhard appeared in the Quentin Tarantino movie Inglourious Basterds. In February 2009, he was shooting the film Massel, made for German television. In 2011, he was in Rome, shooting thr Italian miniseries Caccia al Re – La narcotici.

In 2011, he competed in Ballando con le Stelle, the Italian version of "Dancing with the Stars", accompanied by professional Italian dancer Samanta Togni, in which he danced with his "daughter" Laura Glavan.

In 2016, Burkhard played Gustav Froehlich, a German actor and UFA star, in the international movie The Devil's Mistress by Czech director Filip Renč. The biographical film is about the life of actress Lída Baarová and her relationship with Joseph Goebbels. The film was released in January 2016 in Prague.

Selected filmography

 Und ab geht die Post (1981, TV movie) (segment "Des isch die Poscht")
 Tante Maria (1981, TV movie) as Andreas Büdenbender
 Blut und Ehre: Jugend unter Hitler ( Blood and Honor: Youth Under Hitler (USA)) (1982, TV series) as Hartmut Keller
 Nordlichter: Geschichten zwischen Watt und Wellen (1983, TV series)
 Der Passagier – Welcome to Germany ( The Passenger – Welcome to Germany,  Welcome to Germany (USA)) (1988) as Janko
 Der Fahnder (1988, TV series) as Hendrik Roloff
 Forsthaus Falkenau (1989, TV series) as Konrad 'Konni' Frank
 Zwei Frauen ( Silence Like Glass (USA)) (1989) as Bud
 Sekt oder Selters (1990, TV series)
 Šípková Ruženka ( Sleeping Beauty (Europe: English title)) (1990) as Princ Viliam / Johan
 The New Adventures of Black Beauty (1990-1992, TV series) as Manfred
 Náhrdelník ( The Necklace (Europe: English title)) (1992, TV series) as Julius
 Kleine Haie ( Acting It Out,  Little Sharks) (1992) as Ali
 Sommerliebe (1993, TV movie) as Matthias
 Abgeschminkt! ( Making Up! (USA)) (1993) as Rene
 Mein Mann ist mein Hobby (1993, TV movie) as Franz Ferdinand
 Verliebt, verlobt, verheiratet (1994, TV series)
 Affären (1994) as Thomas Prinz
 La piovra -  (1994, TV miniseries) as Daniele Rannisi, the pirate reporter
 Der König (1994, TV series) as Markus Bassermann
 Ein Fall für zwei (1995, TV series) as Michael Marten
 Kommissar Rex ( Inspector Rex (Austria),  Rex: A Cop's Best Friend (UK)) (1995-2001, TV series) as Alexander Brandtner / Stefan Lanz
 Wem gehört Tobias? ( In the Wrong Hands (USA)) (1996, TV movie) as Thomas Urban
 SOKO 5113 (1996, TV series) as Philip Steger
 Polizeiruf 110 (1996, TV series) as Louis
 Magenta (1996) as Roy
 2 Männer, 2 Frauen – 4 Probleme!? ( Four for Venice,  Two Women, Two Men (USA)) (1998 as Luis
 The Brylcreem Boys (1998) as Krach
 Gefährliche Lust – Ein Mann in Versuchung (1998, TV movie) as Leon Heflin
 Superfire (2002, TV movie) as Reggie
 Zwei Affären und eine Hochzeit (2002, TV movie) as Jan Richter
 We'll Meet Again (2002, TV movie) as Dr. Peter Gaynes
 Yu (2003) as Tom
 Das bisschen Haushalt (2003, TV movie) as Reinhard Burger
  (2004, TV miniseries) as Steve Kammer
 Der Vater meines Sohnes (2004, TV movie) as Ricardo Potero
 Utta Danella – Eine Liebe in Venedig (2005, TV series) as Francesco di Selari
 Der Todestunnel (2005, TV movie) as Andrea Sala
 Leipzig Homicide (2005, TV series) as Ralph Kessler
 Goldene Zeiten (2006) as Mischa Hahn
 Der letzte Zug (2006) as Henry Neumann
 Alarm für Cobra 11 (2007-2008, TV series) as Chris Ritter / Mark Jäger
  (2007) as Florian (lead)
 Inglourious Basterds (2009, USA movie) as Cpl. Wilhelm Wicki
 So ein Schlamassel (2009, TV movie) as Patrick Silberschatz
 La Narcotici (2009, TV series) as Chief Daniele Piazza (lead)
 Inga Lindström – Millionäre küsst man nicht (2010-2013, TV series) as Jasper Svensson / Tomas Lindberg
  (2011, German movie) as Boris Brodsky (lead)
 Bridges (2011, German animated short film-noir) as Captain Saul Bridges (lead)
 Ludwig II (2012) as Graf Maximilian von Holnstein
 Kokowääh 2 (2013) as Luc
 Ohne Gnade (2013, German movie) as Ronzo
 Tränen der Sextner Dolomiten (2014) as Pfarrer Oberrainer
 Unknown Heart (2014) as Andrew Shaw
 Gefällt mir (2014) as Peter Jungbluth
 Shades of Truth (2015, by Liana Marabini (Condor Pictures), as Father Roberto
 Lída Baarová (Devil's Mistress) (2016, Czech film) as Gustav Fröhlich
 The Key (2016) as Tim
  (2016) as Schulz
 Titanium White (2016) as Agent Buckley
 Schneeflöckchen (2017) as Winter
 Rhein-Lahn Krimi: Jammertal (2017) as Peter Löber
 Ronny & Klaid (2018) as Bouncer
 Sauerkrautkoma (2018) as Karl-Heinz Fleischmann

References

External links

1969 births
Living people
German male film actors
German male television actors
20th-century German male actors
21st-century German male actors
German people of Italian descent
German people of Albanian descent
Male actors from Munich